Tapinoma simrothi is a species of ant in the genus Tapinoma. Described by Krausse in 1911, the species is endemic to many countries spanning in Africa, Asia and Europe.

References

Tapinoma
Hymenoptera of Africa
Hymenoptera of Asia
Hymenoptera of Europe
Insects described in 1911